PTN may refer to:
 Harry P. Williams Memorial Airport (IATA/FAA code PTN)
 Paramount Television Network (1948–1956), U.S.
 Partido Trabalhista Nacional (National Labor Party), former name of Podemos (Brazil)
 Pleiotrophin, a protein